Araeosoma coriacea is a species of sea urchin of the family Echinothuriidae. Their armour is covered with spines. It is placed in the genus Araeosoma and lives in the sea. A. coriacea was first scientifically described in 1879 by Alexander Emanuel Agassiz, an American scientist.

See also 
 Araeosoma alternatum
 Araeosoma belli
 Araeosoma coriaceum

References

External links 
 

coriacea